The European (UEFA) zone of qualification for the 1990 FIFA World Cup saw 32 teams competing for 13 places at the finals. UEFA members Italy qualified automatically as hosts of the finals. The qualification process started on 21 May 1988 and ended on 18 November 1989.

Format
Teams were drawn into seven groups, four groups of five teams and three of four teams. All seven group-winners qualified automatically, with the runners-up in the four groups containing five teams (Groups 3, 5, 6 and 7) also qualifying. The two best second-placed teams in the three groups containing only four teams also qualified (Groups 1, 2 and 4), and the second-placed team with the worst record was eliminated.

Draw
The draw for the qualifying groups took place in Zürich, Switzerland on 12 December 1987. During the draw teams were drawn from the 5 pots into the 7 groups. The seedings below were announced ten days before the draw. Teams qualified to the final tournament are in bold. The Seeded teams were the 5 European sides who reached the 1986 Quarter Finals plus Soviet Union and Denmark though there were still security issues with England due to their fan issues in the form of hooliganism which was a factor with all 3 of their away games in the 1990 qualifying campaign being televised live by the BBC

Summary

Results

Group 1

Group 2

Group 3

Group 4

Group 5

Group 6

Group 7

Ranking of runners-up from groups of four

Goalscorers

7 goals

 Marc Van Der Linden

6 goals

 Mo Johnston

5 goals

 Toni Polster
 Flemming Povlsen
 Manolo
 Míchel
 Kubilay Türkyilmaz
 Tanju Çolak

4 goals

 Michal Bílek
 Tomáš Skuhravý
 Andreas Thom
 Rui Águas
 Rudi Völler

3 goals

 Marc Degryse
 Brian Laudrup
 Carmel Busuttil
 Gøran Sørloth
 Hennadiy Lytovchenko
 Oleh Protasov
 Emilio Butragueño
 Rıdvan Dilmen
 Feyyaz Uçar
 Dejan Savićević

2 goals

 Sokol Kushta
 Andreas Herzog
 Patrick Vervoort
 Christos Kolliandris
 Pambos Pittas
 Kent Nielsen
 Matthias Sammer
 John Barnes
 Peter Beardsley
 Gary Lineker
 Mika Lipponen
 Didier Deschamps
 Jean-Pierre Papin
 Attila Pintér
 István Vincze
 Pétur Pétursson
 John Aldridge
 Tony Cascarino
 Ray Houghton
 John Bosman
 Colin Clarke
 Rune Bratseth
 Jan Åge Fjørtoft
 Kjetil Osvold
 Ryszard Tarasiewicz
 Vítor Paneira
 Gavril Balint
 Rodion Cămătaru
 Dorin Mateuţ
 Ioan Sabău
 Ally McCoist
 Richard Gough
 Igor Dobrovolski
 Oleksiy Mykhaylychenko
 Johnny Ekström
 Lothar Matthäus
 Andreas Möller
 Karl-Heinz Riedle
 Faruk Hadžibegić
 Srečko Katanec
 Dragan Stojković
 Zlatko Vujović

1 goal

 Ylli Shehu
 Heimo Pfeifenberger
 Manfred Zsak
 Jan Ceulemans
 Bruno Versavel
 Kalin Bankov
 Bozhidar Iskrenov
 Trifon Ivanov
 Hristo Kolev
 Anyo Sadkov
 Hristo Stoichkov
 Yiannos Ioannou
 Floros Nicolaou
 Jozef Chovanec
 Stanislav Griga
 Ivan Hašek
 Milan Luhový
 Ľubomír Moravčík
 Henrik Andersen
 Jan Bartram
 Lars Elstrup
 Michael Laudrup
 Kim Vilfort
 Thomas Doll
 Rainer Ernst
 Ulf Kirsten
 Paul Gascoigne
 Bryan Robson
 Chris Waddle
 Neil Webb
 Mixu Paatelainen
 Kari Ukkonen
 Laurent Blanc
 Eric Cantona
 Jean-Philippe Durand
 Christian Perez
 Franck Sauzée
 Daniel Xuereb
 Kostas Mavridis
 Tasos Mitropoulos
 Nikos Nioplias
 Imre Boda
 György Bognár
 József Kiprich
 Kálmán Kovács
 Atli Eðvaldsson
 Sigurður Grétarsson
 Ragnar Margeirsson
 Guðmundur Torfason
 Paul McGrath
 Kevin Moran
 Ronnie Whelan
 Guy Hellers
 Robby Langers
 Théo Malget
 Ruud Gullit
 Wim Kieft
 Erwin Koeman
 Ronald Koeman
 Graeme Rutjes
 Marco van Basten
 Michael O'Neill
 Steve Penney
 Jimmy Quinn
 Norman Whiteside
 Erland Johnsen
 Krzysztof Warzycha
 Jacek Ziober
 Rui Barros
 Paulo Futre
 Fernando Gomes
 João Pinto
 Frederico Rosa
 Gheorghe Hagi
 Gheorghe Popescu
 Gordon Durie
 Paul McStay
 Oleksandr Zavarov
 Genar Andrinúa
 Txiki Begiristain
 Fernando
 Juanito
 Julio Salinas
 Leif Engqvist
 Hans Holmqvist
 Klas Ingesson
 Niclas Larsson
 Peter Larsson
 Roger Ljung
 Mats Magnusson
 Christophe Bonvin
 Adrian Knup
 Alain Sutter
 Beat Sutter
 Dario Zuffi
 Oğuz Çetin
 Malcolm Allen
 Mark Bowen
 Dean Saunders
 Thomas Häßler
 Jürgen Klinsmann
 Pierre Littbarski
 Darko Pančev
 Predrag Spasić
 Vujadin Stanojković
 Safet Sušić

1 own goal

 Alan McDonald (playing against Spain)
 Anton Rogan (playing against Spain)
 Gary Gillespie (playing against Yugoslavia)
 Míchel (playing against Ireland)
 Alain Geiger (playing against Belgium)

External links
 European Zone at FIFA.com
 UEFA Qualifier results with full game box scores at Scoreshelf.com

 
UEFA
FIFA World Cup qualification (UEFA)
World Cup
World Cup